Dr. Elizabeth Olivet is a fictional character on Law & Order, the TV crime drama. Carolyn McCormick portrayed her from 1991 to 1997 and in 1999. The character was revived in 2002, although her appearances were infrequent and her last was in 2009. Since Law & Order’s cancellation, the Dr. Olivet character has occasionally been on Law & Order: Special Victims Unit, most recently in 2018.

Dr. Olivet is one of five characters who have appeared in all four of the Law & Order series set in New York City. The other four are Lennie Briscoe (Jerry Orbach), Ed Green (Jesse L. Martin), Arthur Branch (Fred Dalton Thompson), and Elizabeth Rodgers (Leslie Hendrix). Dr. Olivet and police psychiatrist Emil Skoda (J. K. Simmons) are the only Law & Order characters to make crossover appearances on New York Undercover, another Dick Wolf-produced series. The character has appeared in 75 episodes of the Law & Order franchise (66 episodes of Law & Order, six episodes of Law & Order: Special Victims Unit, one episode of Law & Order: Criminal Intent and one episode of Law & Order: Trial by Jury).

Character biography
Olivet is introduced as a clinical psychologist who performs consultation work for the NYPD's 27th Precinct and the District Attorney's office in Manhattan. She is usually tasked with interviewing murder suspects to assess whether or not they are legally sane, and to assist the DA's office in forming psychological profiles.

In her first appearance, she is hired by the precinct as a grief counsellor for Det. Mike Logan (Chris Noth) when his partner Max Greevey (George Dzundza) is murdered in the line of duty. After a rocky start, she helps Logan cope with the loss, and the two form a close bond. The character appears in several episodes afterward.

Olivet does not offer easy answers with more complicated cases. This tendency results some frustration to Executive Assistant District Attorney Ben Stone (Michael Moriarty) and particularly to his successor, Jack McCoy (Sam Waterston), whose prosecution strategies are sometimes hampered by her diagnoses. She is also generally in favour of compassionate, involved psychotherapy in mental institutions, rather than imprisonment or antipsychotic drugs, for genuinely disturbed criminals; this is often shown to clash with the detectives' sense of justice.

In the 1992 episode "Helpless", Olivet becomes a patient and a victim when she's raped and molested by a gynaecologist, Dr. Alex Merritt (Paul Hecht). While Merritt is eventually incarcerated, Olivet's emotional scars never fully heal. In the episode "Point of View", Olivet rape comes back to haunt her when she's subpoenaed to testify in court on behalf of the murderer Mary Kostrinski (Lisa Eichhorn) whom she previously interviewed about her claim that she killed the victim in self-defence after he tried to rape her. During cross-examination, Stone reluctantly questions Olivet about her rape in order to undermine her credibility. After Mary Kostrinski makes a deal with Stone for a reduced sentence, and a new suspect been arrested, Stone apologizes to Olivet, and she forgives him. Several years later, as she is talking to Logan in the 2006 Law & Order: Criminal Intent episode "To the Bone", she is implied to have started a family.

The character was effectively written out of the show in 1997; in the Law & Order universe, Olivet goes into private practice. In the 8th season, she is replaced by Dr Emil Skoda (J.K. Simmons). In 1999, Olivet returns in the episode "Refugee", then again in the episode "Killerz". In 2002, Olivet returns once again in the episode "American Jihad". 

McCoy's volatile relationship with Olivet begins with his first encounter with her in the 1994 episode "Blue Bamboo". In that episode, Olivet interviews a defendant (Laura Linney) who had murdered a sexually abusive employer and informs McCoy that she believes the woman was traumatized by the abuse she suffered. McCoy retorts that she does not belong on his witness list. Since then, McCoy has had a tenuous relationship with Olivet. At times, he has retreated from his defensive position to convince her to help; examples include the episode "Privileged", in which McCoy needs her expert testimony to convict an alcoholic (Eddie Malavarca) accused of murdering his foster parents.

In the 2008 episode "Betrayal", McCoy, now the District Attorney of Manhattan, reveals that, in her days as a grief counsellor, Olivet had sex with a police detective whose partner had been murdered; while not directly stated, it is implied that the detective was Logan. Olivet feels compelled to contradict the prosecution's expert witness, Dr. Lydia Stronach (Nancy Hess), who had done studies on child sexual abuse that were officially censured as dangerous and damaging by the authoritative body in her field. When Olivet informs McCoy that she will be testifying for the defence, he feels he has no other choice but to provide Michael Cutter (Linus Roache), his successor as Executive ADA, with information that could be used in their favour when cross-examining Olivet. When Cutter questions Olivet during the trial, she confirms the affair, but adds that she stopped treating the (still unnamed) detective shortly after the relationship began. In 2009, Olivet makes her last appearance in the episode "Human Flesh Search Engine".

Appearance outside Law & Order 
 In the 1996 New York Undercover episode "Smack Is Back", she counsels Detective Nina Moreno (Lauren Vélez).
 In the 2000 Law & Order: Special Victims Unit episode "Baby Killer", she is hired by a defense attorney to help defend a young boy accused of murder and finds herself at odds with a former colleague, Alexandra Cabot (Stephanie March). She also makes brief appearances in the SVU episodes "...Or Just Look Like One", "Abuse", "Deadly Ambition", "Pathological" and "Remember Me Too". 
 In the Law & Order: Trial by Jury episode "Day", Olivet consults with Tracey Kibre (Bebe Neuwirth) on the mental stability of a rape suspect whom Kibre is prosecuting.
 In the 2006 Law & Order: Criminal Intent episode "To the Bone", Logan goes to her for counselling after he accidentally kills an undercover police officer.
 Also on Law & Order: Criminal Intent, Olivet treats Detective Alexandra Eames (Kathryn Erbe) after she is abducted and tortured, and her partner Detective Robert Goren (Vincent D’Onofrio) while he is on suspension.
 In 2018, her most recent appearance on Law & Order: Special Victims Unit she executed a psych-eval on a victim and testified in a trial.

References

External links

Law & Order characters
Fictional psychologists
Television characters introduced in 1991
Fictional female doctors
Crossover characters in television
American female characters in television
Fictional victims of sexual assault